Indium gallium zinc oxide (IGZO) is a semiconducting material, consisting of indium (In), gallium (Ga), zinc (Zn) and oxygen (O). IGZO thin-film transistors (TFT) are used in the TFT backplane of flat-panel displays (FPDs). IGZO-TFT was developed by Hideo Hosono's group at Tokyo Institute of Technology and Japan Science and Technology Agency (JST) in 2003 (crystalline IGZO-TFT) and in 2004 (amorphous IGZO-TFT).  IGZO-TFT has 20–50 times the electron mobility of amorphous silicon, which has often been used in liquid-crystal displays (LCDs) and e-papers. As a result, IGZO-TFT can improve the speed, resolution and size of flat-panel displays. It is currently used as the thin-film transistors for use in organic light-emitting diode (OLED) TV displays.

IGZO-TFT and its applications are patented by JST. They have been licensed to Samsung Electronics (in 2011) and Sharp (in 2012).

In 2012, Sharp was first to start production of LCD panels incorporating IGZO-TFT. Sharp uses IGZO-TFT for smartphones, tablets, and 32" LCDs. In these, the aperture ratio of the LCD is improved by up to 20%. Power consumption is improved by LCD idling stop technology, which is possible due to the high mobility and low off current of IGZO-TFT. Sharp has started to release high pixel-density panels for notebook applications. IGZO-TFT is also employed in the 14" 3,200x1,800 LCD of an ultrabook PC supplied by Fujitsu, also used in the Razer Blade 14" (Touchscreen Variant) Gaming Laptop and a 55" OLED TV supplied by LG Electronics.

IGZO's advantage over zinc oxide is that it can be deposited as a uniform amorphous phase while retaining the high carrier mobility common to oxide semiconductors. The transistors are slightly photo-sensitive, but the effect becomes significant only in the deep violet to ultra-violet (photon energy above 3 eV) range, offering the possibility of a fully transparent transistor.

The current impediment to large-scale IGZO manufacturing is the synthesis method. The most widely used technique for Transparent Conducting Oxide (TCO) synthesis is Pulsed Laser Deposition(PLD). In PLD, a laser is used to focus on nano-sized spots on solid elemental targets. Laser pulse frequencies are varied between the targets in ratios to control the composition of the film. IGZO can be deposited onto substrates such as quartz, single-crystal silicon, or even plastic due to its ability for low-temperature deposition. The substrates are placed in a PLD vacuum chamber, which controls oxygen pressure in order to ensure favorable electrical properties. After synthesis, the film is annealed, or gradually exposed to air to adjust to the atmosphere.

While PLD is a useful and versatile synthesis technique, it requires expensive equipment and plenty of time for each sample to adjust to regular atmospheric conditions. This is not ideal for industrial manufacturing.

Solution Processing is a more cost effective alternative. Specifically, combustion synthesis techniques can be used. Kim et al. used a metal nitrate solution with an oxidizer to create an  exothermic reaction. One common type of combustion synthesis is spin coating, which involves depositing In and Ga solution layers onto a hot plate and annealing at temperatures roughly between 200 and 400 degrees C, depending on the target composition. The films can be annealed in air, which is a large advantage over PLD.

References

Japanese inventions
Liquid crystal displays
Semiconductor fabrication materials
Oxides